Natters is a municipality in the district Innsbruck-Land in the Austrian state of Tyrol located 3.5 km south of Innsbruck. The village was mentioned in documents around 1151 for the first time. Natters as well as Mutters received connection with Innsbruck thanks to the Stubaitalbahn in 1904. It has 1918 inhabitants and an own hospital. The popular Natterer See is a treasure for tourists in summer.

Population

References

External links

Cities and towns in Innsbruck-Land District